Soon-Young Yoon is a Korean-American advocate for women's human rights and author of "Citizen of the World -- Soon-Young and the UN". She currently serves as a United Nations representative of the International Alliance of Women and Chair of the Board, Women's Environment and Development Organization (WEDO),

Biography

She was born in Pyongyang, Korea, grew up in Ann Arbor and holds a bachelor's degree with honors in French literature and a PhD in anthropology from the University of Michigan. She has worked with UNICEF in Southeast Asia and the WHO Regional Office for South-East Asia in New Delhi. She is a board member of the International Advisory Council at the Harvard AIDS Initiative, Women's Environment and Development Organization (WEDO) and the International Foundation for Ewha Womans University. She has worked as a senior consultant for the WHO on women and tobacco issues and supports the innovation lab for NCDs. She is the main representative of the International Alliance of Women to the United Nations ECOSOC. In that capacity she was Chair of the NGO Committee on the Status of Women, New York  from 2011 to 2015 during which the committee launched the Cities for CEDAW campaign. In 2014, she received the CEDAW award for International Comity from the Friends of the Commission on the Status of Women in San Francisco.

She is co-editor with Jonathan Samet of the WHO monograph, "Gender, Women and the Tobacco Epidemic and former columnist for the EarthTimes newspaper. She has published essays about her life, working with the UN and feminist views on global issues in her book, "Citizen of the World--Soon-Young and the UN" (published by Ewha Womans University Press, August 2021). In 2021, she was appointed to the Advisory Board on Gender Equality of the UN President of the 76th General Assembly, H. E. Ambassador Abdulla Shahid of the Maldives.

Yoon is married to Richard Mills Smith, former Editor-in-Chief, CEO and Chairman of Newsweek, and President of the Pinkerton Foundation.

Publications
 "Citizen of the World--Soon-Young and the UN" - Published by Ewha Womans University Press, August 2021 and Mission Point Press, February, 2022.
 Online book: "Citizen of the World-Soon-Young and the UN" www.soon-young.life
"Gender-Responsive Tobacco Control: Evidence and Options for Policies and Programs", Sarah Hawkes, Kent Buse, Soon-Young Yoon, report summary, UCL Institute for Global Health, October, 2018.
 Gender, women, and the tobacco epidemic, Jonathan M. Samet and Soon-Young Yoon (eds.), World Health Organization, 2010, 
 TEDx talk on global citizenship: https://www.youtube.com/watch?v=NXXTayRnS_Q

References

American officials of the United Nations
University of Michigan alumni
People from Ann Arbor, Michigan